Radwanków may refer to the following places in Poland:

Radwanków Królewski
Radwanków Szlachecki